Wasabröd is a Swedish producer of Scandinavian style crispbread. The Wasabröd company has been in business since 1919, opening its first bakery in the city of Skellefteå. Since 1983 it has been under foreign ownership, first by the Swiss pharmaceutical corporation Sandoz (later merged with Ciba Geigy to become Novartis), and from 1999 by the Italian food producer Barilla Alimentare S.p.A.

History
The first bakery in Skellefteå, founded by Karl Edvard Lundström, was supplemented by another, completely mechanized, one in Filipstad in 1931, which has since become the main seat of the corporation. It later acquired several other Swedish bakeries. It started exporting bread in the 1940s, with the first foreign subsidiary founded in Denmark in 1965 and the first foreign bakery built in Celle in Germany in 1967. In the early 21st century Wasabröd sells about 80% of its production outside Sweden.

K. E. Lundström, the founder of the company, had run his own bakery in Skellefteå since 1915 (Firma K. E. Lundström), with the corporation founded in 1919, AB Skellefteå spisbrödsfabrik, taking its original name from the hometown. The Filipstad subsidiary which developed into the main part of the company took the name AB Wasa spisbrödsfabrik in 1934, which was shortened to AB Wasabröd in 1964. The brand Wasa was originally that of one particular product, Vasaknäcke, featuring an image of King Gustavus Vasa. The company has used both a royal crown and the peculiar heraldic charge, the garb, which gave name to the Vasa dynasty, in its marketing. (Using the letter W instead of V is an archaism in Swedish; it is not uncommon in marketing, but does not affect the pronunciation.)

Barilla's bakery in Filipstad employs 440 people and produces 33,000 tonnes of crispbread annually. In 2009-2014, the owner invested 150 million in the Filipstad factory to modernise the equipment.

Products
Wasabröd produces a wide variety of crispbreads. The original crisp bread is made of rye, but their various products include sesame, wheat, and other grains. Like matzo, Wasa is noted for its long shelf life.

Royal warrant
The company has the status of a Purveyor to the Royal Court of Sweden.

See also
 House of Vasa
 List of Swedish companies

References

External links 
 
 Wasa homepage

Brand name crackers
Food and drink companies of Sweden
Purveyors to the Court of Sweden
Barilla (company)
1919 establishments in Sweden
Food and drink companies established in 1919
Swedish brands
Companies based in Västerbotten County